Cartel Crew is an American reality television series that premiered on VH1 on January 7, 2019. It chronicles the daily lives of people whose families have had previous connections to cartels in Miami, Florida.  The series depicts how the individuals attempt to navigate through life and deal with the effects that the cartel has had on their daily lives.

Cast

Episodes

Season 1 (2019)

Season 2 (2019)

Season 3 (2021)

References

External links
 
 

2010s American reality television series
2020s American reality television series
2019 American television series debuts
2021 American television series endings
English-language television shows
Television shows set in Miami
VH1 original programming
Works about Colombian drug cartels
Works about Mexican drug cartels